BSV Ölper 2000 is a German association football and sports club from the city of Braunschweig, Lower Saxony.

History
The club was formed on 15 June 2000 as a merger between Braunschweiger SV 1922 and Sportfreunde Ölper. Both clubs had previously shared a ground, Sportplatz Biberweg, in the Ölper district of Braunschweig.

BSV 22 Braunschweig was formed on 22 August 1922 and following World War II and reestablished as Ballspielverein von 1945, before returning to its original name in 1949. SF Ölper was founded in 1929.

While BSV 22 was the more successful senior side of the two, having spent multiple seasons at the highest state-level of football in Lower Saxony through the 1990s, SF Ölper was well known for its youth teams. Two future German internationals, Tobias Rau and Alexander Madlung, got their start at the club.

In its first season after the merger, the new club was promoted to the Niedersachsenliga-Ost (V) where they would play until being relegated in 2010. The following Landesliga Braunschweig (VI) season also ended in relegation. After one season in the 7th tier Bezirksliga Braunschweig 2, the club returned to Landesliga play for the 2012–13 season.

Honours
 Landesliga Braunschweig (VI):
Champions (1): 2001
 Bezirksliga Braunschweig 2 (VII):
Champions (1): 2012

Notable former players
The list includes former players of BSV Ölper 2000 and its predecessors who made appearances in professional football before or after playing for the club:

  Özkan Koçtürk
  Alexander Madlung (SF Ölper)
  Goran Radojević (BSV 22)
  Tobias Rau (SF Ölper)
  Holger Wehlage

Manager history

 Heinz-Günter Scheil (2004–2007)
 Willi Feer (2007–2009)
 Holger Wehlage (2009–2010)
 Thomas Schneider (2010–2013)
 Andreas Müller / Stephan Pientak (2013–2015)
 Gertjan Durishti / Chris Borgsdorf (2015–2016)
 Mesut Dereköy / Gertjan Durishti (2016–)

Other sports

Besides its football division, BSV Ölper 2000 also has departments for badminton, gymnastics, nine-pin bowling, team handball, swimming, and tennis.

References

External links
 Official website 

Football clubs in Germany
Football clubs in Lower Saxony
Multi-sport clubs in Germany
Association football clubs established in 2000
2000 establishments in Germany
Sport in Braunschweig
German handball clubs
Organisations based in Braunschweig